Hoffman Construction Company is a privately held construction founded in 1922. It is headquartered in Portland, Oregon. It also has an office location in Seattle.  With a revenue of US$1.4 billion in FY2017, Hoffman was the 4th largest privately held company in Oregon and SW Washington by revenue in FY2017. It was the second largest general contractor in the Portland metro area in April 2019.

History
Lee Hoffman (born May 15, 1850) moved to Portland in the 1870s with his family and worked constructing bridges and other projects until his death, including the Bull Run pipeline. After his accidental death on July 21, 1895, his wife Julia removed to Boston, Massachusetts, with their children, including Lee Hawley Hoffman. Lee Hawley entered Harvard College in 1902, but the family returned to Oregon partly in 1903. Lee Hawley graduated with a degree in architecture from Harvard in 1906, and the family returned to Portland that year, living in their home on NW 23rd avenue. Portland Business Journal reported Hoffman as the second largest general contractor in the Portland metro area in place as the second largest general contractor in the Portland area in April 2019.

The Hoffmans still owned various real estate in Portland due to the success of Lee Hoffman's earlier construction businesses, and they were turned into the family owned Wauna Land Company in 1903. Lee Hawley began working for Morris H. Whitehouse’s architectural firm in 1908, with the firm later also consisting of Edgar M. Lazarus and J. André Fouilhoux. Hoffman then married Caroline Couch Burns on June 9, 1910. Over time, Hoffman began to focus more on projects for Wauna Land Company and less on his architectural work, leaving the firm by 1917. He started working as a contractor in 1919, and by the end of 1921 had the firm of Hoffman & Rasmussen. The current company was founded in 1922 by Hoffman.

The company started out building primarily apartment buildings and industrial structures in Portland, and had grown to more than 400 employees by 1928. One of the company's first prominent projects was building the Terminal Sales Building in 1926. The next year Hoffman completed the Public Services Building, which was the tallest building in the city upon completion. That year they also built the new Heathman Hotel, the Portland Theater, and an office building all on the same block on Broadway in downtown Portland. In 1928, Hoffman constructed the 12-story Buyer's Building (now Loyalty Building) in just over six months.

Hoffman expand to Seattle in 1929 with the construction of a 12-story apartment building at 1223 Spring Street. The firm also built Cushman Dam No. 2 that year near Shelton, Washington, for Tacoma Power and Light.

After the onset of the Great Depression, projects for the firm mostly dried up. Hoffman went from 32 contracts in 1929 to just ten in 1932. The last big project was a joint venture on expanding the Meier & Frank Building in Portland in 1930, with the next large project not coming until ten years later. In 1932, the firm moved its offices into the Ladd Carriage House, where it remained until 1970. During the Depression, much of the company's work shifted to government contracts, such as post offices in Oregon, Washington, and Idaho. Those included large ones in Salem, Longview, and Marshfield (now Coos Bay). Other public works included the Jackson County Courthouse, Tillamook County Courthouse, the Oregon State Library, the Quartz Creek Bridge on U.S. 26, Powerhouse No. 1 on the Bonneville Dam, and several viaducts in Oregon. Hoffman also built the Portland Art Museum in 1931 and its 1938 expansion, as well as a new library at Willamette University in Salem (now Smullin Hall).

With World War II raging elsewhere, the firm was contracted to build several buildings at Fort Lewis and a new hospital at the Vancouver Barracks in 1940, and barracks for the Navy in Bremerton in 1941, all in Washington. They also built the hospital at the Cushman Indian School in Tacoma, Washington, in 1941.

Following the entry of the United States into the war, Hoffman continued work on military projects including more buildings for the Navy in Bremerton and construction on the Hanford Nuclear Reservation and surrounding area, both as joint projects with other firms. In all, Hoffman did $49 million in work for the federal government during World War II, including work at Camp Abbot, Camp Adair, Umatilla Army Depot, and a Navy hospital in Astoria, all in Oregon. Other wartime construction included an aluminum rolling mill near Spokane, McCaw General Hospital in Walla Walla, and lots of housing near industrial centers in Washington.

Post World War II
After the war, the firm began a long-term relationship with Crown Zellerbach Corporation in which Hoffman remodeled Crown's pulp and paper mills in West Linn and Camas. Hoffman also received several projects from the First National Bank of Oregon in 1946 to remodel and expand several branches in Portland and build a new one in Salem. Also during the 1940s, the firm built a store and warehouse for Sears in Eugene, along with expanding the Portland store. The next significant project came with constructing the new Oregonian Building in 1947 in downtown Portland. The next year the company started construction on a new plant for Nabisco in Portland, and in 1950 finished an aluminum plant for Alcoa in Vancouver, Washington. During the 1950s Hoffman completed many projects for lumber industry companies such as Weyerhaeuser, Boise Cascade, Crown Zellerbach, and Georgia-Pacific, among others, plus more work at Hanford.

In 1955, Burns Hoffman became president of the firm, with the company now called Hoffman Construction Company and owned by brothers W. Burns and Eric as father Lee Hoffman moved away from day-to-day work. Eric Hoffman (1923–2016) became president of the company in 1956 and became chairman in 1974. Lee Hawley Hoffman died on August 8, 1959.

The firm also built Portland's Wilson High School, finishing the project in 1956, and expanded the Public Services Building that same year. Hoffman's next big project was building the Veterans Memorial Coliseum, along with a Sheraton Hotel in the Lloyd District, both in 1959. In the 1960s, the company continued with industrial construction from British Columbia to Northern California. Burns Hoffman resigned as president and left in 1965, with brother Eric buying out his brother and becoming president as well the sole owner. Cecil Drinkward came to Hoffman in 1967 as a vice president, and his son Wayne joined in 1985. Cecil Drinkward became president in 1974. In the late 1960s, the company shifted emphasis from paper and forestry industry where they started to commercial construction.

As the 1970s began, the company finished construction on the Georgia-Pacific Building (now Standard Insurance Center), the new headquarters for Georgia-Pacific. In 1970, it finished the building, and moved its own headquarters to one of the 30 floors. That year it also won the contract to build the First National Bank Tower (now Wells Fargo Center) in Portland, which was completed in 1971. Additional projects in the 1970s included the new campus of St. Vincent Hospital west of Portland, St. Peter Hospital near Olympia, part of the campus of The Evergreen State College, the Health Sciences Building on the Sylvania campus of Portland Community College, and Salem's new civic center.

The company also completed the new federal building in Seattle in 1974, the now Edith Green – Wendell Wyatt Federal Building federal building in Portland in 1975, and the Federal Office Building Complex in Anchorage in 1977, all for the General Services Administration (GSA). Additional federal work and oil-related work in Alaska caused Hoffman to open a permanent office in Anchorage in 1975. Hoffman also built power plants in the 1970s, such as most of the Trojan Nuclear Power Plant in Oregon, parts of the Washington Public Power Supply System’s nuclear plants at Hanford, and part of the Boardman Coal Plant in Eastern Oregon. Also in Eastern Oregon, they built the largest cement plant in the Pacific Northwest at Durkee starting in 1978.

At the end of the decade, Hoffman finished the Sixteen Hundred Bell Plaza tower in 1977 and then finished One Union Square and the Westin Building both in 1981, all in Seattle. Meanwhile, in Portland the company finished One Main Place in 1980, the Portland Building in 1982, the PacWest Center in 1985, the Justice Center in 1982, the Performing Arts Center in 1987, and the One Financial Center (now Bank of America Center) in 1987. Other notable projects in the 1980s included the Farm Credit Banks Building in Spokane, plus the ARCO Tower and SOHIO Alaska Petroleum Company Headquarters in Anchorage, as well as water treatment plants in California and Alaska. In 1983, the company moved its headquarters to what is now Unitus Plaza at 1300 SW Sixth in Portland.

During the 1990s Hoffman shifted much work to construction for hi-tech companies such as Intel. This included work at Intel's Aloha Campus, New Mexico fabs, Chandler, Arizona fabs, and at its Hillsboro campuses. Other projects included the Casey Eye Institute at OHSU in Portland in 1991, the Snake River Correctional Facility, the new Doernbecher Children's Hospital, as well at projects at Willamette University, Reed College, Oregon State University, Lewis & Clark College, Linfield College, and the University of Portland. It also built the Oregon State Office Building in 1992 and Metro's headquarters in 1994, both in Portland's Lloyd District, and Portland's new federal courthouse. Outside of the Northwest, the firm had projects in Washington, DC, Hawaii, and New York. By 1994 the firm had grown to $613 million in contracts. The younger Drinkward took over as Hoffman president in 1992.

Twenty-First Century
After Hoffman completed an expansion at the Snake River Correctional Institute in Eastern Oregon, the state audited the work on the project in 1999. Auditors alleged some overpayments, while the company and the Oregon Department of Corrections disputed those allegations. Hoffman moved into the Fox Tower in downtown Portland in 2000 after constructing the building, and added a permanent lobby exhibit showcasing the company's history. In 2013, the firm was listed as one of Oregon's most admired companies.

The Intel D1X project built by Hoffman was named as the largest construction project in Oregon history in 2017. Intel hired Hoffman for this project in 2010. The newspaper reports "several billion dollars" but the exact amount is a "closely guarded secret". In 2015, Hoffman filed a $50.8 million lien on the D1X, and the lien stayed in place two years later in June 2017. In December 2017, The Oregonian followed up to report that Hoffman had withdrawn the "mysterious $50 lien". According to a statement provided by Intel, ""We are pleased that the dispute has been amicably resolved. The terms and conditions of the resolution are confidential,"

Hoffman Construction was issued a warning by the City of Portland in September 2020 for having utilized a subcontractor which obtained women-owned status fraudulently so they can be awarded jobs as a subcontractor on Portland city government projects under a program designed to help disadvantaged business. This came after the subcontractor under question was caught.

Health and Safety 
Portland Tribune's Joseph Gallivan named Hoffman's 1715 S.W. Salmon St and Lincoln High School sites as those still carrying on business as usual during the COVID-19 pandemic. A worker interviewed by Willamette Week on the Hayward Field renovation project site reports while Hoffman has issued strict social distancing instructions, it is realistically not being followed in the field. The same newspaper article also discussed a complaint filed against Hoffman with the Oregon OSHA on March 30, 2020 concerning the project at Phil and Penny Knight Campus for Accelerating Scientific Impact which reads "Multiple employees are working in lifts next to each other, and lunch shacks are packed full of employees sitting next to each other". Daily Journal of Commerce also identified Hoffman's 5 MLK, a mixed-use 17 story project near the east end of Burnside Bridge as a site where an OSHA complaint has been registered over social distancing and lack of hand-washing stations.

Major Projects

Hoffman is known for building the Fox Tower, Memorial Coliseum, the Oregon Convention Center and the Wells Fargo Center.

Current Projects
Expansion of Nike, Inc.'s World Headquarters near Beaverton, Oregon
Multnomah County Central Courthouse in Portland, Oregon
Lincoln High School in Portland, Oregon.
Intel FAB 38 in Kiryat Gat, Israel.

Completed Major Projects

Civic / Cultural 
 Seattle Central Library in Seattle, Washington
 Experience Music Project museum in Seattle, Washington
 Town Center Park in Wilsonville, Oregon
 Portland Japanese Garden
 Main exhibit hall at the Evergreen Aviation & Space Museum in McMinnville, Oregon
Expansion of the Portland Expo Center in Portland, Oregon
The Amphitheater at Clark County (now Amphitheater Northwest) in Ridgefield, Washington
Mark O. Hatfield United States Courthouse in Portland, Oregon
Seattle City Hall in Seattle, Washington

Healthcare 
 Doernbecher Children's Hospital in Portland, Oregon
 Center for Health & Healing at Oregon Health & Sciences University in Portland, Oregon
Randall Children's Hospital at Legacy Emanuel in Portland, Oregon

High-Rise 
 Portland Building in Portland, Oregon, completed in 1982, the concrete building envelope started leaking about five years after completion, then progressed to leaks around windows. Problems continued to worsen over the years despite repair attempts.
 Mirabella Portland in Portland, Oregon
 Bellevue Towers in Bellevue, Washington
 One Main Place office tower in Portland, Oregon
 Twelve/West apartment tower in Portland, Oregon
Meier & Frank Building remodel and addition of The Nines in Portland, Oregon
One Union Square skyscraper in Seattle, Washington
Henry M. Jackson Federal Building in Seattle, Washington
Westin Building in Seattle, Washington
Qwest Plaza in Seattle, Washington
Daimler Trucks North America headquarters in Portland, Oregon
PacWest Center in Portland, Oregon
Park Avenue West skyscraper in Portland, Oregon

Athletics 
Ron Tonkin Field in Hillsboro, Oregon
Hillsboro Stadium in Hillsboro, Oregon
Matthew Knight Arena at the University of Oregon in Eugene, Oregon

Education 
Paul L. Boley Law Library at Lewis & Clark Law School in Portland, Oregon
Ford Hall at Willamette University in Salem, Oregon

Transportation 
 Washington Park underground light rail station in Portland, Oregon
 Link Light Rail University of Washington Station

Mixed-Use 
Former Post Office in Coos Bay, Oregon
New First National Bank Building in Portland, Oregon
Weinhard Brewery Complex mixed-use development in Portland, Oregon

Manufacturing 
 Intel D1D and D1X projects and expansion at Ronler Acres Campus in Hillsboro, Oregon
 Boeing 777x Composite Wing Manufacturing Center in Everett, WA

Aviation 
Canopy at Portland International Airport in Portland, Oregon
Headquarters for the Port of Portland at Portland International Airport in Oregon
Nike Air Hangar at the Hillsboro Airport in Hillsboro, Oregon

References

Footnotes

Construction and civil engineering companies of the United States
Companies based in Portland, Oregon
Construction and civil engineering companies established in 1922
1922 establishments in Oregon
Privately held companies based in Oregon